Victor Maduro (born 23 July 1964) is a judoka who competed internationally for Aruba.

Career
Maduro competed at the 1988 Summer Olympics in the judo in the middleweight division, he received a bye in the first round, but lost in the second round to Heng-An Chiu from Chinese Taipei so didn't advance any further.

References

1964 births
Living people
Judoka at the 1988 Summer Olympics
Aruban male judoka
Olympic judoka of Aruba